Stephan Koplowitz is a director and choreographer and media artist specializing in site-specific multimedia performances. Since the 1980s, Koplowitz, an international site artist and former Dean of Dance at CalArts, has dedicated himself to site-specific work. He has made work on and for the steps of the New York Public Library, in the halls of London’s Natural History Museum, in a German factory, and in the windows of Grand Central Station
Koplowitz was one of 14 artists included in the book Site Dance: Choreographers and the Lure of Alternative Spaces edited by Melanie Kloetzel and Carolyn Pavlik, published by Florida University Press, 2011 In 2022, Koplowitz's book, On Site - Methods for Site-Specific Performance Creation was published by Oxford University Press: https://global.oup.com/academic/product/on-site-9780197515242?cc=us&lang=en&

Awards and fellowships
 2017 – Rockefeller Foundation Bellagio Center Residency Fellowship
 2015 – The Wallace Alexander Gerbode Foundation and The William and Flora Hewlett Foundation Choreographic Commission
 2014 – ColumbusAlive.com named Sullivant Travels, by Stephan Koplowitz, Best Dance of 2014   
 2013 – Houston Press, awarded Natural Acts in Artificial Water, Best Ensemble Production of 2013   
 2010 – Distinguished Alumnus Award from the University of Utah
 2007 Boston Globe named Koplowitz’ (iseea) one of the ten best dance works of 2007
 2004 Alpert Award in the Arts
 2003 Guggenheim Fellowship in Choreography 
 2003 Dance Theater Workshop’s Artist Resource and Media Laboratory Fellowship
 2000 New York Dance and Performance Awards (“Bessie”)
 1996 – Time Out Magazine’s Best Dance Production Award to Genesis Canyon
 1994 – Distinguished Alumnus Award from Wesleyan University (class of 1979)

Selected works
 2018 The Beginning as part of The Northfield Experience
 2018 Past the Past as part of The Northfield Experience
 2018 Reading Time as part of The Northfield Experience
 2018 The Northfield Experience (production) – Commissioned by St. Olaf and Carleton Colleges in association with the city of Northfield, Minnesota
 2018 – Mill Town – Commissioned by the Bates Dance Festival
 2017 – Occupy (a site-specific journey through an urban garden)Commissioned by the AXIS Dance Company, co-presented with the Dancers' Group and Yerba Buena Gardens Festival
 2015 – Play(as) As part of Trolley Dances 2015, Commissioned by the San Diego Dance Theater
 2014 – The Past is Up (Sullivant's Travels)
 2014 – Horizon Time (Sullivant's Travels)
 2014 – Learn, Capture, Repeat  (Sullivant's Travels)
 2014 – One Way: A Telematic Trio (Sullivant's Travels - A site-specific journey through the mind of a building-Commissioned by The Ohio State University Department of Dance and College of Arts and Sciences
 2013 – Red Line Time, a site-adaptive durational performance for all fourteen stations of LA Metro’s Red Line
 2013 – lines, tides, shores… A site-specific performance in three sections for the Cudahy Gardens, Milwaukee Art Museum 
 2013 – The Current Past, A site-specific performance for the North Point Water Tower, Milwaukee, WI
 2012 – Natural Acts in Artificial Water, part of Stephan Koplowitz: TaskForce 
 2012 The Chair Yields  Gustavus Adolphus College,
 2012 in situ, Eckman Mall, Gustavus Adolphus College
 2012 The Old New Thing for the Torrey Atrium, Warren & Donna Beck Academic Hall, Gustavus Adolphus College
 2012 (Re)Fraction, A site-specific performance in lighted windows of Christ Chapel , Gustavus Adolphus College
 2009 Taskforce: Liquid Landscapes UK 
 2008 Five Entrances into a War Machine 
 2008 Taskforce: Liquid Landscapes LA 
 2008 Taskforce: Mapping IdyllWild 
 2007 Revealed at Amherst 
 2007 iseea 
 2006 Revealed (NYC) 
 2006 A Walk Between Two Worlds 
 2005 Light Lines 
 2004 The Grand Step Project 
 2003 Terrarium 
 2001 (In)Formations 
 2000 Aquacade for Asphalt Green
 1999 Kokerei Projekt: Kohle Korper 
 1999 Fenestrations2 
 1998 Babel Index 
 1998 War with the Newts 
 1997 Webbed Feats 
 1996 Genesis Canyon 
 1996 Off the Walls 
 1993 Thicker Than Water 
 1991 The Governed Body 
 1990 Fall Weather Friend 
 1989 Big Thirst 
 1987 Fenestrations 
 1986 Untitled (Ethiopia Suite) 
 1986 Famished 
 1985 I’m Growing 
 1983 – Heart Throb Theater

References

External links
 Official Website
 Youtube Channel
 Photobooth

American choreographers
1956 births
Living people
University of Utah alumni
Wesleyan University alumni